Diana Dumitru is a Moldovan historian. She is considered the leading scholar of the fate of Bessarabia's and Bukovina's Jews during the Holocaust.

Works

References

21st-century Moldovan historians
Historians of the Holocaust
Year of birth missing (living people)
Living people